My Sister Lives On The Mantelpiece  is a 2011 novel written by Annabel Pitcher.  It won the 2012 Branford Boase Award, and received at least 25 other award nominations.

Ten-year-old Jamie Mathews and his family, consisting of his sister, Jasmine, who is 15, and his father, an alcoholic, moves to the Lake District from London after Jamie's mother has an affair and leaves. Sitting on the Mantelpiece in their new home is the ashes of Rose, Jas's twin sister, who was killed on September 9 in the London Bombings, five years earlier. Jas has been deeply troubled by the death of her sister, yet it doesn't bother Jamie since he was too young to really know Rose and thus he hasn’t cried since. At his new school, a Church of England school, Jamie befriends Sunya, who is a Muslim. Jamie knows his father wouldn't approve of their friendship, as he hates Muslims and blames Rose's death on the entire Muslim population.

This novel is narrated by Jamie and expresses his deep feelings.

Critical reception
Critic Philip Ardagh of The Guardian succinctly headlined: "The fact that this is Pitcher's first foray into fiction is gob-smacking. It's a wonderful piece of writing."

References

2011 British novels
Novels set in Cumbria
Orion Books books